"Bandage" is a song by Japanese rock band, Lands and serves as their debut single as well as the lead single from their debut album Olympos. The song was written and produced by composer  and serves as the theme song of the film with the same name that stars Jin Akanishi, who plays the leader and vocalist of the fictional band. "Bandage" was released on November 25, 2009, their record label J Storm.

Background
Back in November 2008, it was reported that Lands was planning on making their "real world" debut, In September 2009, it was confirmed that the band would be making their debut in the fall of 2009 with the CD release of "Bandage", which was also confirmed to be the theme song of the movie also titled, Bandage. In October, the release date of the song was announced.

Track listing

Chart performance
On the Japan Hot 100 "Bandage" debuted at number 87. The following week the song went straight to the number-one spot on the chart. It peaked at number one on the Hot Singles Sales, and number nine on the Hot Top Airplay chart. On the Oricon chart, "Bandage" claimed the number-one spot with 211,000 copies sold. In total the single has sold about 248,000 copies and has been certified Platinum by the Recording Industry Association of Japan.

Charts

Format
CD single (JACA-5185)
CD+DVD (JACA-5183)

References

External links
Bandage page 

2009 debut singles
2009 songs
Billboard Japan Hot 100 number-one singles
Jin Akanishi songs
J Storm singles
Oricon Weekly number-one singles
Songs written by Takeshi Kobayashi
Song recordings produced by Takeshi Kobayashi